José Ramon Marmolejos (born January 2, 1993), sometimes referred to as José Marmolejos-Diaz, is a Dominican professional baseball first baseman and outfielder who is currently a free agent. He previously played in Major League Baseball (MLB) for the Seattle Mariners and in Nippon Professional Baseball for the Tohoku Rakuten Golden Eagles.

Career

Washington Nationals
Marmolejos signed with the Washington Nationals as an international free agent in June 2011. After hitting .310 over 124 games with 11 home runs for the Class-A Hagerstown Suns of the South Atlantic League in 2015, Marmolejos was named the Nationals' Minor League Player of the Year. He repeated in 2016, earning organizational Minor League Player of the Year honors with a combined .289 batting average and 13 home runs with the High-A Potomac Nationals and the Class-AA Harrisburg Senators.

The Nationals added Marmolejos to their 40-man roster after the 2016 season. On February 24, 2017, Marmolejos was placed on the 60-day disabled list with a left forearm strain. While rehabbing, Marmolejos went 5-for-6 with the Harrisburg Senators in a May 22, 2017, game visiting the Erie SeaWolves. He capped off his day by hitting a two-out, go-ahead grand slam in the ninth inning, and the Senators won the ballgame 14–13. He was activated from the disabled list and assigned to continue playing for Class-AA Harrisburg on June 1, 2017. He was named to participate in the Eastern League All-Star game in 2017. In total, he hit .288 with 14 home runs in 107 games in Class-AA for the 2017 season. Marmolejos was designated for assignment on July 26, 2018. He remained with the Nationals and received a non-roster invitation to major league spring training before the 2019 season. Marmolejos became a free agent after the 2019 season.

Seattle Mariners
On November 27, 2019, Marmolejos signed a minor league contract with the Seattle Mariners, that included an invitation to spring training.

On July 24, 2020, Marmolejos made his MLB debut on Opening Day, going hitless over 3 at-bats against the Houston Astros. Marmolejos finished the 2020 season hitting .206 with 6 home runs and 18 RBI. Marmolejos hit .139 with 3 home runs and 9 RBI in 31 games for the Mariners in 2021 before being designated for assignment on May 20, 2021. He was outrighted to the Triple-A Tacoma Rainiers on May 23. After having a great stint with Triple-A Tacoma, hitting .360 with 23 home runs and 71 RBI's through 72 games, his contract was re-selected by the Mariners on August 30, 2021.
On September 14, Marmolejos was once again designated for assignment by the Mariners. On October 5, Marmolejos elected free agency.

Tohoku Rakuten Golden Eagles
On December 7, 2021, Marmolejos signed with the Tohoku Rakuten Golden Eagles of Nippon Professional Baseball. He became a free agent following the 2022 season.

References

External links

1993 births
Living people
Águilas Cibaeñas players
Auburn Doubledays players
Dominican Republic expatriate baseball players in the United States
Dominican Summer League Nationals players
Estrellas Orientales players
Fresno Grizzlies players
Gulf Coast Nationals players
Hagerstown Suns players
Harrisburg Senators players
Major League Baseball first basemen
Major League Baseball left fielders
Major League Baseball players from the Dominican Republic
Potomac Nationals players
Seattle Mariners players
Sportspeople from Santo Domingo
Syracuse Chiefs players
Tacoma Rainiers players
Tigres del Licey players
Tohoku Rakuten Golden Eagles players